Time Heals Nothing is the third studio album by American sludge metal band Crowbar, released in 1995 through Pavement Music. The album was rereleased in 2000 by Spitfire Records with new album artwork, courtesy of Rich DiSilvio.

Track listing

Personnel
Kirk Windstein – vocals, rhythm guitar
Matt Thomas – lead guitar
Todd Strange – bass
Craig Nunenmacher – drums
Tito "Bad Boy Bobby Ray" Ralph – vocals on track 5
David Farrell – engineering
Bernie Grundman – mastering

Music videos
"The Only Factor"

References

Crowbar (American band) albums
1995 albums